Zoltán Szatmári (born 2 May 1979 in Budapest) is a Hungarian football player who plays for Győri ETO FC.

References
EUFO
HLSZ
Zoltán Szatmári at Soccerway

1979 births
Living people
Footballers from Budapest
Hungarian footballers
Association football goalkeepers
FC Dabas footballers
MTK Budapest FC players
BFC Siófok players
Lyngby Boldklub players
Vasas SC players
Jászberényi SE footballers
III. Kerületi TUE footballers
FC Tatabánya players
Komáromi FC footballers
Győri ETO FC players
Hungarian expatriate footballers
Expatriate men's footballers in Denmark
Hungarian expatriate sportspeople in Denmark
Nemzeti Bajnokság II players